Main Street, credited to Roy Wood & Wizzard (whereas the group's first two albums had been credited simply to Wizzard), is the group's third album. It was initially planned to showcase the more jazz-rock-oriented, deliberately uncommercial side of the group as part of a double album, along with the material that became the 1974 album Introducing Eddy & The Falcons.

History
When they eventually recorded Main Street (or Wizzo as it was originally to be called) in 1975, the group had rather slipped out of the public eye and was on the point of disbanding.  The single, also credited to Roy Wood’s Wizzard, "Indiana Rainbow" (backed by a non-album track "The Thing Is This (This Is The Thing)"), released in March 1976, did not make the BBC Radio 1 playlist.  As a result, Jet Records, to whom Wood was signed at the time, cancelled the album's release.  The tapes only came to light in 1999 and, with Wood's blessing, released by Edsel, a re-issue label which specialised largely in licensing long-deleted albums from major companies and had recently made Introducing Eddy & the Falcons, available on CD for the first time.

In the booklet which accompanied its belated appearance, Wood wrote that "this was probably a last attempt to retain some sort of sanity, trying to grow up, and not carry on indefinitely being just another pop group."  Had it been successful, he went on, his writing would have taken a different route and the group would have gone on to perform the kind of music bands like Jamiroquai were recording by that time.  The music is certainly more jazz-rock based, and represents a conscious effort to leave the more commercial pop-rock element behind.

In 2006, the compilation album, Looking Thru' The Eyes of Roy Wood and Wizzard was released, and it included two songs from Main Street  as well as "The Thing Is This (This Is The Thing)" and a previously unreleased album out-take, "Human Cannonball".

"French Perfume" was performed live by the Wizzo Band, which Wood formed the following year, on their BBC 'Sight and Sound In Concert' spot (a simulcast on BBC TV and Radio 1 in stereo) in April 1977, and "Saxmaniacs", an instrumental, was released in 1979 as the B-side to a Wood solo single, "(We're) On The Road Again".

Track listing
All songs written by Roy Wood.
"Main Street"  – 6:03
"Saxmaniacs"  – 3:05
"The Fire in His Guitar"  – 7:17
"French Perfume"  – 4:45
"Take My Hand"  – 3:58
"Don’t You Feel Better"  – 5:13
"Indiana Rainbow"  – 4:00
"I Should Have Known"  – 4:38

According to the booket accompanying the 2020 reissue of Main Street, the original running order included the track 'Human Cannonball' (featured as a bonus track) as track 3 between 'Saxmaniax' and 'The Fire in His Guitar'.

Personnel
Roy Wood - guitars, lead and backing vocals, saxes, oboe, string bass, French horn, electric sitar, bass clarinet, electronic keyboards, bass, drums
Rick Price - bass, pedal steel guitar
Charlie Grima - drums, congas, percussion, vocals on "Don't You Feel Better"
Bob Brady – piano
Nick Pentelow - saxes, flutes
Mike Burney – saxes, flutes

With
Richard Plant - vocals on "Take My Hand"

References

Main Street (album)
Wizzard albums
Albums produced by Roy Wood